Marko Todorović (: 2 June 1929 – 29 August 2000) was a Serbian actor, famous for playing roles of important historical figures. Among those the best known is Tito whom he played in the 1974 spectacle The Republic of Užice, and later in a series of television docudramas directed by Sava Mrmak.

He is, however, best known for the comical role of family patriarch Milan Todorović in the Lude godine series of films.

Selected filmography

References

External links

1929 births
2000 deaths
Serbian male actors
20th-century Serbian male actors